is a city located in Okayama Prefecture, Japan. , the city had an estimated population of 42,477 in 17568 households and a population density of 51 persons per km2.

Geography
Maniwa is located in north-central Okayama Prefecture and is approximately in the center of the Chūgoku Mountains, which forms its northern border with Tottori Prefecture. Occupying 11.6% of Okayama Prefecture, it has the largest area of any municipality in the prefecture. It measures roughly 55 km from North to South, and 35 km from east to west. The mountainous part of the city to the north is dominated by Mount Hiruzen and the Hiruzen Highlands, which is the source of the Asahi River, emerges from Mount Hiruzen in Maniwa, and its upper reaches are located within the town. Major tributaries of the Asahi in Maniwa include the Bitchū, Nakazui, Kōchi, Meki, and the Shinjō rivers. The Hiruzen Highlands sit at an elevation of 500–600 meters above sea-level, and is part of the Daisen-Oki National Park. With Maniwa being far from any major fault lines, the chance of an earthquake above 7.0 magnitude is less than 1%, small compared to other areas of Japan.  
 
Lakes
Lake Yubara
Dams
Yubara Dam
Hokubo Dam

Adjoining municipalities
Okayama Prefecture
Tsuyama
Takahashi
Niimi
Kibichūō
Misaki
Kagamino
Shinjō
Tottori Prefecture
Kurayoshi
Misasa
Kōfu

Climate 
Maniwa's climate varies greatly from north to south. The Hiruzen Highlands up north, due to being at a higher elevation, tend to be much cooler in the summer, with heavy snow in the winter, and temperatures often dropping into the negatives. However, further down south in Kuse to Hokubo, snow may fall in the winter but rarely accumulates, but the summers are hotter in comparison to Hiruzen.

Maniwa is also situated far in land, which means that typhoons often do not affect it as badly as seaside towns in Okayama. The mountains throughout the town create a barrier from extremely heavy winds, and so often rain is the biggest side effect of any typhoons passing nearby.

Demographics
Per Japanese census data, the population of Maniwa in 2020 is 42,725 people. Maniwa has been conducting censuses since 1920.

History 
The area of Maniwa is part of ancient Mimasaka Province. From 1764 to 1871 it developed as the castle town of Katsuyama Domain, a 23,000 koku holding of the Miura clan. Following the Meiji restoration, Katsuyama village was established with the creation of the modern municipalities system on June 1, 1889. It was raised to town status on February 26, 1896.  The modern city of Maniwa was established on March 31, 2005, from the merger of  Katsuyama with the town of Hokubō (from Jōbō District); the towns of Ochiai, Yubara and Kuse, and the villages of Mikamo, Kawakami, Yatsuka and Chūka (all from Maniwa District), the latter three which make up the area of Hiruzen as a whole.

Government
Maniwa has a mayor-council form of government with a directly elected mayor and a unicameral city council of 24 members. Maniwa, collectively with the village of Shinjō, contributes one member to the Okayama Prefectural Assembly. In terms of national politics, the city is part of the Okayama 3rd district of the lower house of the Diet of Japan.

Economy
With thriving lumber industries, Maniwa is investing heavily in sustainable development of its resources. Approximately 80% of Maniwa's land is covered in forest, 60% of which was planted after World War Two.  Maniwa is also currently known for its Biomass initiatives, and has been given the title of a "Biomass Town", alongside 317 other areas within Japan. It has a biomass electric power plant, which runs using woody biomass in the forms of by-products of the city's lumber industries and household waste. The plant products over 10,000 kW, and can power more than 22,000 of Maniwa's homes, of which it sells some of the energy back to the National Grid. The City Office in Kuse is also fueled by a biomass boiler, and also uses solar panels in an attempt to reduce its carbon footprint.

Education
Maniwa has 24 public elementary schools and six public junior high school operated by the city government, and two public high schools operated by the Okayama prefectural Board of Education.

Transportation

Railway 
 JR West (JR West) - Kishin Line
  -  -  -  -  -  -

Highways 
  Chūgoku Expressway - Mimasaka-Oiwake Parking Area - Ochiai Junction - Ochiai Interchange - Maniwa Parking Area - Hokubō Junction - Hokubō Interchange
  Okayama Expressway - Hokubō Junction
  Yonago Expressway - Ochiai Junction - Kuse Interchange - Ueno Parking Area - Yubara Interchange - Hiruzen-Kōgen Service Area - Hiruzen Interchange

Roadside Station

Sister and Friendship cities
 Victor Harbor, Australia - Sister city agreement concluded on May 26, 2000, with the former Hiruzen area. However, since the merger to create Maniwa City occurred, this arrangement is no longer in effect.
 Ruijin, China - Friendship city agreement concluded on January 16, 2001

Local attractions

Hiruzen 
80% of tourists visit the Hiruzen Highlands, which are known as one of the more popular resort areas in Western Japan. Due to its high elevation, the highlands remain cool in the summer, whilst gains heavy snow in the winter, making it popular with local skiers. Hiruzen also is home to the largest Jersey Cow Farm in Japan, with the "Jersey Land" facilities giving tourists the ability to see the cows up close, milk them, and eat foods made from the Jersey milk. The highlands are also known for their "Cycling Road", a 30 km loop of well-maintained cycling paths, with various rental shops along the route.

Yubara 
Yubara Onsen is also a popular resort, with its numerous hot springs (onsen), and close proximity to Hiruzen. Its most well-known onsen, "Sunayu", has been designated one of the representative hot springs of West Japan, and sits at the base of Yubara Dam. It is a rare mixed-sex onsen, and is also free and open 24/7.

Katsuyama 
Maniwa is also home to one of Japan's Top 100 waterfalls, Kanba Waterfall. Standing at 110 meters tall and 20 meters wide, it is the largest waterfall in West Japan. It is also home to groups of Japanese macaque, most often seen during the winter as they come to the valley floor in search of food.

Katsuyama is also an old castle town, which prospered as a stop along the Izumo Kaido, a trade route stretching from Izumo to Kyoto and Osaka. It was also a port, as the river stretches down to Okayama City, and would only take a day or so to reach on the shallow boats they used at the time. Natsume Soseki also stayed here during a war for a few weeks. The town dedicated a 600m stretch of streets to preserve as it would have been in the Edo Period, including the burying of powerlines and reduction of street lights. Currently, the town is known for its Noren curtains, which hang 24/7 outside most homes and shops, and are all made by Yoko Kano, a local artist.

Kuse 
Kuse, home to the main city office, is also known for the "Former Senkyo Elementary School." Built in a Western style in 1907, the school is no longer used day-to-day, and has become a tourist attraction. With certain dramas such as "Always" having been filmed here, it is often popular with fans of those dramas. Free to the public, the school also provides Japanese school uniforms you can try at no cost.

Ochiai 
Further down south, Ochiai is most famous for the "Daigo-Sakura", a 1000+ year old cherry tree. Sat at the top of a hill deep in the mountains, this cherry blossom tree tends to bloom between mid-late April. A smaller tree, birthed from the original, sits close by on the hilltop. The name "Daigo-Sakura" came from former Emperor Go-Daigo, who, when on his way to exile in the Oki Islands, stopped by this tree and apparently was most impressed by it.

Ochiai is also known for its yōkan, a Japanese sweet made from red beans (anko). In the shape of the narrow boats that used to carry goods down the river to Okayama, and with a light crust of sugar, these sweets are very popular as souvenirs from the city.

Hokubo 
At the southernmost tip of Maniwa, Hokubo is most well known for its fireflies in June. One of the best breeding grounds in the prefecture, many tourists visit during this time to see the fireflies during their mating season.

Notable places and events
The old castle town of Mimasaka-Katsuyama
Yubara Onsen town
Kanba Waterfall (Japan's Top 100 Waterfalls)
Former Senkyō Elementary School Building (Important Cultural Property)
Daigo-Sakura (1000+ year old Cherry Blossom tree)
Hiruzen Area
Mount Hiruzen
Shiogama Reisen (Japan's Top 100 Cold Springs)
Hiruzen Plateau
Hiruzen Kōgen Center / Joyful Park (Amusement park)
Hiruzen Jersey Land
Ski resorts
 Hotaru-no-Sato, Hokubo.
 Bitchu-Ana Cave, Hokubo

Festivals
Hiruzen Omiya Obon Dance Festival (Nationally Designated Important Cultural Property)
Katsuyama Festival (October 19–20)
Kuse Festival (October 25–26)

Onsen
 Yubara Onsen

Noted people from Maniwa
Yoichi Numata, actor

References

External links

 Maniwa City official website 

Cities in Okayama Prefecture
Maniwa